Lam Chih Bing (born 29 December 1976) is a Singaporean professional golfer.

Career 
Lam was a scratch golfer at seventeen, and attended the University of Arizona in the United States before completing an MBA at the University of Leicester in England, following his ambition to become a fund manager. Instead he began a professional golf career, joining the Asian Tour in 2001. In his first seven seasons Lam struggled to retain his card, never finishing inside the top 60 on the Order of Merit, but 2008 was his breakthrough year, with four top-10s and a maiden tour win at the prestigious season-ending Volvo Masters of Asia.

Professional wins (10)

Asian Tour wins (1)

Professional Golf Tour of India wins (1)

All Thailand Golf Tour wins (1)
2010 Singha Masters

ASEAN PGA Tour wins (1)

Other wins (7)
2000 PFP Classic (Malaysia), Malaysian PGA Championship
2001 Genting Masters (Malaysia)
2003 Tiger Challenge, Accenture Champion of Champions (both Singapore)
2008 Singapore PGA Championship

Results in major championships

Note: Lam only played in The Open Championship.

CUT = missed the half-way cut

Results in World Golf Championships

"T" = Tied

Team appearances
Amateur
Eisenhower Trophy (representing Singapore): 1996

Professional
World Cup (representing Singapore): 2002, 2005, 2006, 2009, 2011

References

External links

Singaporean male golfers
Arizona Wildcats men's golfers
Asian Tour golfers
Golfers at the 1994 Asian Games
Asian Games competitors for Singapore
Singaporean people of Chinese descent
People from Singapore
1976 births
Living people